Chalicopoma laevigatum  is a species of minute salt marsh snail with an operculum, a terrestrial gastropod mollusk, or micromollusk, in the family Assimineidae. 

This species is endemic to Guam. According to The Encyclopedia of World Problems and Human Potential, the Omphalotropis laevigata is an endangered species.

References

 Mollusc Specialist Group 1996.  Omphalotropis laevigata.   2006 IUCN Red List of Threatened Species.   Downloaded on 7 August 2007.
 The Encyclopedia of World Problems and Human Potential. Threatened species of Omphalotropis laevigata.

External links
 Quadras, J. F.; Möllendorf, O. F. von. (1894). Diagnoses specierum novarum a J. F. Quadras in insulis Mariannis collectarum. Nachrichtsblatt der Deutschen Malakozoologischen Gesellschaft. 26(1-2): 13-22, 33-42

Fauna of Guam
Assimineidae
Gastropods described in 1894